Piz Daint is a mountain of the Swiss Ortler Alps, overlooking the Ofen Pass in the canton of Graubünden. The closest locality is Tschierv on the north side.

Name 
The name was originally spelled Piz d'Aint, which is Romansh for "inner peak". The name is relative to the peak to the east called Piz d'Ora, meaning "outer peak". It corresponds to the local naming convention.

The name was officially changed to Piz Daint towards the end of the 20th century.

Other uses 
Piz Daint is the namesake of the CSCS supercomputer announced in 2013.

See also
 Piz Dora

References

External links

 Piz Daint Supercomputer
 Piz Daint on Hikr

Mountains of Graubünden
Mountains of the Alps
Ortler Alps
Mountains of Switzerland
Two-thousanders of Switzerland
Val Müstair